National Highway 930, commonly referred to as NH 930 is a national highway in  India. It is a spur road of National Highway 30. NH-930 traverses the states of Chhattisgarh and Maharashtra in India.

Route 

 Chhattisgarh

Purur - Balod - Kusumkasa - Kumhari - Manpur - Maharastra Border.

 Maharashtra

Sawargaon border - Muramgaon- Dhanora - Gadchiroli - Saoli - Mul -Chandrapur - Warora - Wani - Karanji.

Junctions  

  Terminal near Raipur.
  near Chandrapur.
  near Warora.
  Terminal near Sarangarh.

See also 

 List of National Highways in India
 List of National Highways in India by state

References

External links 

 NH 930 on OpenStreetMap

National highways in India
National Highways in Chhattisgarh
National Highways in Maharashtra